Tukrapara is a village in Kamrup rural district, situated in the south bank of the river Brahmaputra.

Transport
The village is near National Highway 37 and connected to nearby towns and cities with regular buses and other modes of transportation.

See also
 Udayan Vihar
 Tupamari

References

Villages in Kamrup district